The following is a list of football stadiums in Iran, ordered by capacity. The minimum capacity is 5,000.

See also
List of Asian stadiums by capacity
List of association football stadiums by capacity

References

 
Iran
Stadiums
Football stadiums